"Blues from a Gun" is a Modern Rock number-one hit from The Jesus and Mary Chain's album Automatic from 1989. It was released in four different formats, including a 3" Mini CD single in a paper gatefold sleeve.  It is one of the few singles by the band featuring lead vocals from William, as opposed to Jim Reid.

Chart performance
The single reached number 32 in the UK single charts, and three weeks at number one on the U.S. Billboard Modern Rock Tracks chart which listed the most played songs on alternative radio.

Track listing
All tracks written by Jim Reid and William Reid, except where noted 

7" (NEG41)
 "Blues from a Gun" - 4:43
 "Shimmer" - 2:45

10" (NEG41TE) Gatefold
 "Blues from a Gun" - 4:43
 "Shimmer" - 2:45
 "Penetration" - 2:46
 "Break Me Down" - 2:23

12" (NEG41T)
 "Blues from a Gun" - 4:43
 "Shimmer" - 2:45
 "Penetration" - 2:46
 "Subway" - 2:04

CD3 (NEG41CD)
 "Blues from a Gun" - 4:43
 "Shimmer" - 2:45
 "Penetration" - 2:46
 "My Girl" (Smokey Robinson, Ronald White) - 2:31

Personnel

The Jesus and Mary Chain
Jim Reid – guitar, synthesizer, drum programming, producer
William Reid – vocals, guitar, synthesizer, drum programming, producer

Additional personnel
Alan Moulder – engineer (track 1)
Andrew Catlin – photography

Charts

See also
List of Billboard number-one alternative singles of the 1980s

References

The Jesus and Mary Chain songs
1989 singles
Songs written by Jim Reid
Songs written by William Reid (musician)
1989 songs
Blanco y Negro Records singles